We Are One is the second album by the jazz ensemble Pieces of a Dream, issued in 1982 on Elektra Records. The album reached No. 22 on the Billboard Top R&B Albums chart.

Track listing

Singles
The track, "Mt. Airy Groove", reached No. 33 on the Billboard Hot R&B Singles chart. It was covered by the rap group Leaders of the New School on the album Rubáiyát: Elektra's 40th Anniversary.

Personnel

Herb Smith - acoustic guitar, electric guitar 
Cedric A. Napoleon - bass
Dexter Wansel - synthesizer on "Please Don't Do This To Me"
Grover Washington, Jr. - soprano saxophone, vocoder on "You Know I Want You"
Curtis D. Harmon - drums
James K. Lloyd - Fender Rhodes, Steinway Concert Grand piano, Jupiter 8 synthesizer
Leonard "Dr." Gibbs (tracks: A2, B1, B4), Ralph MacDonald (tracks: A1, A3, A5), Vincent Diggs (tracks: A2, B4) - percussion
Barbara Walker, Cedric A. Napoleon - lead vocals on "You Know I Want You"
Rachelle Barnes - lead and backing vocals on "Yo Frat"
Cedric A. Napoleon - lead vocals on "Please Don't Do This To Me"
Cynthia Biggs, Barbara Walker, Theodore Wortham Sr. - backing vocals on "Please Don't Do This to Me"

Charts

Singles

References

1982 albums
Pieces of a Dream (band) albums
Elektra Records albums
Albums recorded at Sigma Sound Studios